St. Ignatius of Loyola Catholic Secondary School is a separate school in Oakville, Ontario. The school teaches curriculum based on the Catholic faith, and has close ties with the Diocese of Hamilton and the local church, St. Matthew's Parish.

Academics

The academic program at Loyola is taught by ten principal departments, with the efforts of each coordinated by a department head. The departments at Loyola are:
 Mathematics
 Science
 English
 French/Moderns
 Technological Studies
 Physical Education
 Business
 Canadian and World Studies
 Religion, Humanities, and Social Sciences
 Special Education

The school has an academic staff numbering over 91.5. Loyola has one of the best technology programs in the region, with students from other schools (both separate and public) participating in technology programs offered by the school.

The school also has a strong English program, with 92% of students in grade ten in 2008 passing the OSSLT (Ontario Secondary Student Literacy Test).

Loyola has one of the highest literacy rate in all of Ontario, Canada.

Extracurriculars

Loyola offers a wide variety of extracurricular activities. In addition to over 46 varsity sports teams, the school is home to dozens of clubs of various disciplines. Clubs and organizations at the school include:
 Student Council
 Chess Club
 Social Justice Club
 Game club
 Prefects
 Debate Club
 Student Athletic Council
 Multicultural Club
 Concert Band
 Jazz Band
 Free The Children Club
 SOMA (Southern Ontario Model United Nations Assembly)
 Hawk Watch (School Newspaper)
 Swim Team
 Math Club
 Celebrate Life Club
 H.O.P.E.
 Mock Trial
 Glee Club
 Environmental Club
Robotics Team

The school also offers opportunities for various trips and exchanges to countries including the United States, Italy, Germany, France, Switzerland and Japan. 

Loyola also provides opportunities for its students to participate in regional activities, such as the Southern Ontario Model United Nations Assembly (SOMA).

Recently, particular emphasis has been placed on the Loyola athletics program, with the school holding numerous buyouts and pep rallies in order to drum up support for various sports teams. Additionally, since 2007, the school has upgraded numerous sports facilities at the school, including replacing the gymnasium floor, purchasing electronic bleachers for spectators and spending over $2 million Canadian on a new sports field, which is now completed.

Notable alumni 

 Anjulie, singer and songwriter
 Josh Janniere - Professional Soccer Player 
 Adam van Koeverden - Olympic rower, winner of Gold medal in the 2004 Olympics and MP for Milton
 Kojo Aidoo - Professional Canadian Football Player

See also
List of high schools in Ontario

References

High schools in Oakville, Ontario
Catholic secondary schools in Ontario
Educational institutions established in 1982
1982 establishments in Ontario